This album was re-issued in 1966 as V-8 Ford Blues.

Track listing
All compositions by Mose Allison except as indicated

 "V-8 Ford Blues" (Willie Love) – 2:11
 "Please Don't Talk About Me When I'm Gone" (Sidney Clare, Sam H. Stept) – 1:26
 "Baby, Please Don't Go" (Big Joe Williams) – 2:32
 "Hey, Good Lookin'" (Hank Williams) – 1:41
 "I Love the Life I Live" (Willie Dixon) – 2:22
 "I Ain't Got Nobody" (Roger Graham, Spencer Williams) – 1:51
 "Back on the Corner" – 1:54
 "Life Is Suicide" (Percy Mayfield) – 2:44
 "'Deed I Do" (Walter Hirsch, Fred Rose) – 1:55
 "Ask Me Nice" – 2:32
 "You're a Sweetheart" (Harold Adamson, Jimmy McHugh) – 2:11
 "Mad with You" (Lightnin' Hopkins) – 2:10

Personnel
Tracks 3 and 9 previously released on Transfiguration of Hiram Brown (recorded December 21, 1959 – January 11, 1960):
Mose Allison – piano, vocals
Addison Farmer – bass
Jerry Segal – drums

Tracks 5, 6, 11, and 12 previously released on I Love the Life I Live (recorded June 30, 1960):
Mose Allison – piano, vocals
Henry Grimes – bass
Paul Motian – drums

Tracks 1, 2, 4, 7, 8, and 10 (recorded May 16, 1961):
Mose Allison – piano, vocals
Aaron Bell – bass
Osie Johnson – drums

References

Mose Allison albums
1961 albums
Albums produced by Teo Macero